Petr Stehlík (born 15 April 1977 in Turnov) is a Czech shot putter. His personal best throw is 20.96 metres, achieved in May 2004 in Turnov. The Czech record is currently held by Remigius Machura with 21.93 metres.

He finished fifth at the 2002 European Indoor Championships and twelfth at the 2004 Olympic Games. He also competed at the World Championships in 2001, 2003, 2005 and 2007 as well as the 2008 Olympic Games without reaching the finals.

Achievements

References

External links 
 
 
 

1977 births
Living people
Czech male shot putters
Athletes (track and field) at the 2004 Summer Olympics
Athletes (track and field) at the 2008 Summer Olympics
Olympic athletes of the Czech Republic
People from Turnov
Sportspeople from the Liberec Region